Yingshan County may refer to two existing counties as well as a former county of the People's Republic of China:

Yingshan County, Hubei, Huanggang, Hubei
Yingshan County, Sichuan (营山县), Nanchong, Sichuan
Yingshan Subdistrict (应山街道), Guangshui, Suizhou, Hubei
Guangshui, Suizhou, Hubei was known as Yingshan County (应山县) before December 1988